Colleen M. O'Connor (born December 17, 1951, in Chicago, Illinois) is an American former ice dancer. With partner James Millns, she is the 1974-1976 U.S. national champion, the 1975 World silver medalist, the 1976 World bronze medalist, and the 1976 Olympic bronze medalist.

They were inducted into the United States Figure Skating Hall of Fame in 1993.

Competitive highlights
(with Millns)

References

 
 
   

1951 births
American female ice dancers
Figure skaters at the 1976 Winter Olympics
Olympic bronze medalists for the United States in figure skating
Living people
Figure skaters from Chicago
Olympic medalists in figure skating
World Figure Skating Championships medalists
Medalists at the 1976 Winter Olympics
21st-century American women